Comparable transactions, in the context of mergers and acquisitions, is one of the conventional methods to value a company for sale. The main approach of the method is to look at similar or comparable transactions where the acquisition target has a similar business model and similar client base to the company being evaluated. The value of a business is then arrived at using a similar multiple of the company's EBITDA as demonstrated by multiples of EBITDA achieved in past, completed transactions of comparable businesses in the sector. See Valuation using multiples more generally.
This approach is fundamentally different from that of DCF valuation method, which calculates intrinsic value.

References
What is a Comparable Company Analysis
Comparable Transaction Analysis in the Glossary of mergers-acquisitions.org

Mergers and acquisitions